The 40th Biathlon World Championships were held in 2005 for the third time in Hochfilzen, Austria from 4 to 13 March. Approximately 80,000 spectators went to see the competitions. The mixed relay, contested for the first time in the World Championships, was held in Khanty-Mansiysk, Russia.

Schedule

Medal winners

Men

Women

Mixed

Medal summary

References 

2005
World Championships
2005 in Austria
International sports competitions hosted by Austria
Tyrol (state)